is a Japanese manga artist. His major work Trigun was adapted into an anime series and film. He also designed the characters for the video game and anime series Gungrave, and has been working on the manga Blood Blockade Battlefront.

Biography
Nightow was born in Yokohama, and moved to Yokosuka when he was in elementary school, and spent his junior high and high school years in Shizuoka. His first exposure to comics was through Fujio Akatsuka's Tensai Bakabon, and he was also influenced by the comics of Leiji Matsumoto such as Yamato, Harlock and 999. He also was drawn to the work done in Shogakukan's Weekly Shōnen Sunday which included artists Rumiko Takahashi and Fujihiko Hosono. Regarding "new wave" artists, he liked Katsuhiro Otomo from Sayonara Nippon, and Fumiko Takano.

He studied social science and then majored in media studies at Housei University.  While there, he drew manga as a hobby, and made some dojinshi. After graduation, he worked Sekisui House where he sold apartments. After three and a half years, he quit his job to draw full-time. His first one-shot manga was based on the popular video game franchise Samurai Spirits. He had also developed a story titled Call XXXX which was published in Super Jump magazine.

With the help of a publisher friend, he submitted a Trigun story for the February 1995 issue of the Tokuma Shoten magazine Shōnen Captain, and began regular serialization two months later in April. However, Shōnen Captain was canceled early in 1997, and when Nightow was approached by the magazine Young King Ours, published by Shōnen Gahōsha, they were interested in him beginning a new work. Nightow though, was troubled by the idea of leaving Trigun incomplete, and requested to be allowed to finish the series. The story jumps forward two years with the start of Maximum. Despite this, Nightow has stated that the new title was purely down to the change of publishers. Trigun Maximum ran until 2007 and generated 14 tankōbon volumes. The Trigun series was adapted into an anime series by Madhouse and had a limited broadcast run in 1998. It received an English adaptation which aired on Cartoon Network. Its popularity in the United States resulted in creation of a  feature film Trigun: Badlands Rumble in 2010.

Nightow created the characters and story for the Sega/Red Entertainment third-person shooter video game series Gungrave. The series also received an anime adaptation.

In 2009, Nightow started a new manga series Blood Blockade Battlefront, which was serialized in Jump Square various magazines from Jump SQ.19 to Jump SQ. Crown.  The series follows the adventures of a photographer who acquires supernatural visions and gets involved in an organization to fight monsters and terrorists.

Works

References

External links 

 

1967 births
Living people
Converts to Christianity
People from Yokohama
Japanese Christians
Manga artists from Kanagawa Prefecture
Trigun
Hosei University alumni